What Could Possibly Go Wrong is the debut studio album by American singer and rapper Dominic Fike. It was originally scheduled for release on July 10, 2020, but due to the Black Lives Matter protests that were occurring at the time it was pushed back three weeks.

Background
Fike began hinting at an album in the works in early 2019. He kept hinting at this album throughout 2019, and released the singles "Açaí Bowl", "Rollerblades", "Phone Numbers" with Kenny Beats, and "Hit Me Up" with Omar Apollo and Kenny Beats throughout the year. He also collaborated with Brockhampton several times, including on a video uploaded to Brockhampton's YouTube channel titled "This is Dominic Fike". In September 2019, he played a then unreleased song titled "Chicken Tenders" on his Rain or Shine tour.

On June 21, 2020, another video, titled "In-Focus with Dominic Fike", was uploaded to Brockhampton's YouTube channel, in which Fike talked about his upcoming debut album. On June 26, he released "Chicken Tenders", the lead single from his then yet to be named debut album. Then, on July 9, he announced that the album would be titled What Could Possibly Go Wrong and would be released on July 31. He also released the second single "Politics & Violence".

Track listing

Notes
  signifies a co-producer
  signifies an additional producer

Personnel
Musicians

 Brianna Rhodes – strings 
 Capi – production 
 Cary Singer – guitar 
 Dominic Fike – vocals, production , guitar , keyboard , recording engineer 
 Jim-E Stack – production 
 Julian Cruz – production , strings , additional vocals 
 Katie Capp – cello 
 Kenny Beats – producer 
 Phil Nageon de Lestang – production , guitar 
 The Roommates – production , strings 
 Ryan Raines – drums 
 Sean Sobash – bass 
 Todd Pritchard – guitar 
 Tom Elmhirst – programmer 
 Westerns – guitar 
 Yasmeen – guitar , violin 

Technical personnel

 Chris Galland – assistant engineer 
 Dominic Fike – recording engineer 
 Greg Eliason – engineer 
 Jeremie Inhaber – assistant engineer 
 Julian Cruz – recording engineer , mixing engineer 
 Kenny Beats – recording engineer 
 Manny Marroquin – mixing engineer 
 Matt Scatchell – assistant engineer 
 Nick Booth – assistant engineer 
 Randy Merrill – mastering engineer 
 Robert Florent – engineer 
 The Roommates – recording engineer 
 Ryan Dulude – assistant engineer 
 Tom Elmhirst – mixing engineer

Charts

References

2020 debut albums
Dominic Fike albums
Columbia Records albums